Antonio Siciliano (born in Taurianova 4 February 1936) is an Italian film editor. From his debut in the early 1970s Siciliano worked as editor in more than 150 Italian productions, including films by Giuliano Montaldo, Damiano Damiani, Luigi Comencini, Luciano Salce, Steno, E.B. Clucher, Massimo Troisi and Franco Giraldi.

In 1992 he won the David di Donatello for Best Editing for the Carlo Verdone's film Maledetto il giorno che t'ho incontrato.

Selected filmography
The President of Borgorosso Football Club (1970)
 Tell Me You Do Everything for Me (1976)

References

External links

Living people
Italian film editors
1936 births
David di Donatello winners
People from the Province of Reggio Calabria